Charles William James Fennell (1902-1970) was an Australian rugby league player in the 1920s. Fennell was a long serving South Sydney Rabbitohs player.

Career
He was graded in 1926 from the Waterloo junior club and made first grade the following year. He played seven seasons at Souths between 1927 and 1934, and won a premiership with Souths in 1927. He retired in 1934, after being unable to consistently retain his first grade place for a number of years.

Death
Fennell died on 22 July 1970 aged 68.

References

South Sydney Rabbitohs players
Australian rugby league players
1902 births
1970 deaths
Rugby league hookers
Rugby league props
Rugby league players from Sydney